Jeduthun Wilcox (November 18, 1768 – July 18, 1838) was an American politician and a United States representative from New Hampshire.

Early life
Born in Middletown in the Connecticut Colony, Wilcox studied law with Benjamin A. Gilbert; was admitted to the bar in 1802 and commenced practice in Orford Grafton County, New Hampshire.

Career
Wilcox served as member of the New Hampshire House of Representatives from 1809 to 1811.

Elected as a Federalist to the Thirteenth and Fourteenth Congresses, Wilcox served as United States Representative for the state of New Hampshire (March 4, 1813 – March 3, 1817).

Death
Wilcox died in Orford, New Hampshire,  on July 18, 1838 (age 69 years, 8 months). He is interred at Orford Village Cemetery, Orford, New Hampshire.

Family life
The son of John and Eunice Wilcox, he married Sarah Fisk and they had a son, Leonard Wilcox, who served as a United States senator from New Hampshire. After Sarah's death, he married Elisabeth Todd and had six daughters.

References

External links

 

1768 births
1838 deaths
Politicians from Middletown, Connecticut
Federalist Party members of the United States House of Representatives from New Hampshire
Members of the New Hampshire House of Representatives
People from Orford, New Hampshire